Oaklisp is a portable object-oriented Scheme developed by Kevin J. Lang and Barak A. Pearlmutter while Computer Science PhD students at Carnegie Mellon University.  Oaklisp uses a superset of Scheme syntax.  It is based on generic operations rather than functions, and features anonymous classes, multiple inheritance, a strong error system, setters and locators for operations, and a facility for dynamic binding.

Version 1.2 includes an interface, bytecode compiler, run-time system and documentation.

References

External links
Oaklisp homepage

Scheme (programming language) implementations
Object-oriented programming languages